Spencer Sutherland (born August 31, 1992) is an American indie pop singer, songwriter, and actor from Pickerington, Ohio, United States. 

In June 2017, he was picked as Elvis Duran's Artist of the Month appearing on NBC's Today show with Hoda Kotb and Kathie Lee Gifford performing his hit "Selfish" live on the program. This became his debut appearance on U.S. national television.

His single "Selfish," released in February 2017, reached over 4 million streams on Apple Music. Sutherland also co-wrote on Timeflies' new EP. In April 2018, he received his first major movie song placement in "Honey: Rise Up And Dance" with the song "Work You Out".

Sutherland was a contestant on the UK version of The X Factor in 2017 and made it through to the Live Shows and was mentored by Louis Walsh as part of the Boys category. He sang Marvin Gaye's "Let's Get it On" in his initial audition and James Arthur’s "Say You Won't Let Go" in the group performance. After performing "Who You Are" in the first live show he was voted off. 

In 2018, Sutherland released a slew of singles: “Talk”, “Tell Me” and “Fine.” Starting on September 9 of that same year, Sutherland joined alongside JAGMAC to open for the boy band In Real Life on their Tonight Belongs To You Tour across the United States. In October 2018, Sutherland signed with BMG US. He also had his first major music tour spanning from September to November 2018. Sutherland announced his first headlining tour, The Freaking Out Tour, on June 11, 2019. The tour spanned from August 7, 2019, to August 28, 2019, with Justice Carradine as an opening act.

In 2019, Sutherland released singles "Sweater", “NONE of this has been about you", and “Freaking Out”.  He is releasing his debut EP, "NONE of this has been about you", on March 15, 2019.
In December 2020, Spencer released his sophomore EP “Indigo” with major playlist positioning for single “Wonder.”

In 2021, Sutherland made the move to acting and scored a part in the Netflix movie Afterlife of the Party starring Victoria Justice, with whom he dueted for the song 'Home' which was used for the closing credits of the movie, and Midori Francis. Along with “Home”, Spencer secured 3 other movie placement songs. In October 2021, Spencer started as a guest star on the Amazon series “I know what you did last summer.” 
From November 9th - November 24th, He embarked on his second headline tour, “The What A Shame Tour.”

During 2022, Sutherland was the opening act for Big Time Rush during their “Forever" tour. In July of the same year, the single “Everybody” was released.

Sutherland announced his debut album "In His Mania"  via social media on February 10, 2023. It is scheduled for release on March 10, 2023, and will be followed by the "In His Mania" US tour.

Discography

Singles 

2013: "Heartstrings"
2015: "Bad Influence"
2016: "Girls"
2017: "Selfish"
2018: "Talk"
2018: "Tell Me"
2018: "Fine"
2019: "Sweater"
2019: "None of this has been about you"
2019: "Freaking Out"
2019: “Grateful”
2020: “Help”
2020: “Too many friends”
2020: “Wonder”
2020: “Indigo”
2021: “Shame”
2021: “Paranoia”
2021: “Lemons”
2022: “Everybody”
2022: “Flower”

References

External links 
 

1992 births
Living people
American soul singers
American singer-songwriters
American expatriates in the United Kingdom
The X Factor (British TV series) contestants
21st-century American singers